Ithamar (sometimes Ythamar) was the first bishop in England to be Saxon-born rather than consecrated by the Irish or from among Augustine's Roman missionaries.  He was also the first Saxon bishop of Rochester.

Life

Ithamar was consecrated by the Archbishop of Canterbury, Honorius, and was said by Bede to be "of the Kentish nation, but not inferior to his [episcopal] predecessors for learning and conduct of life".

Upon consecration as bishop, Ithamar took his new name from Ithamar, a son of Aaron, from the Old Testament. Although a number of new Anglo-Saxon bishops had taken new names upon either entering religious life or upon consecration as bishops, these names were usually taken from church history. The practice of taking a new name from the Old Testament was extremely rare in the Roman tradition, but did occur more often in the Celtic Church.

As bishop, Ithamar consecrated Deusdedit as the first Saxon archbishop of Canterbury on 26 March 655.

Death and legacy
Ithamar died between 655 and 664, probably close to 656, at Rochester.

After Ithamar's death he was considered a saint and given a shrine at Rochester Cathedral. His feast day is 10 June. There is no written Life detailing his biography, but a short work giving his miracles was composed in the 12th century.  At that time, his remains were translated to a new larger shrine in Rochester Cathedral. The work on his miracles survives in one manuscript, MS Corpus Christi College Cambridge 161.

Citations

References

External links
  – listing of most contemporary and close to contemporary mentions of Ithamar in the primary sources.
 

Bishops of Rochester
7th-century English bishops
Burials at Rochester Cathedral